The Weerbaarheidsafdeling (WA; "Resilience Department") was the paramilitary arm of the National Socialist Movement in the Netherlands (NSB), the fascist political party that collaborated with the German occupiers of the Netherlands during World War II. The organization, roughly equivalent to the German SA, was founded in 1932 by Anton Mussert, co-founder of the NSB in 1931 and its leader until the end of the war. Members wore and marched in black uniforms and were thus called "blackshirts". In 1933 the Dutch government banned the wearing of uniforms (by civilians), and the WA was disbanded in 1935 in order to forestall the Dutch government's banning it. In 1940, after the German invasion, the WA became openly active again, and more ruthless than before. They specialized in violent attacks, particularly on the Dutch Jewish population.

Occupation 
After the occupation the WA was put to use in much the same way as the SA was, forcing owners of restaurants and cafes to put up signs saying Jooden niet gewenscht ("Jews not welcome") and harassing and provoking inhabitants of neighbourhoods with many Jewish inhabitants. This led to the formation of "knokploegen", informal militias, and fights erupting between the WA and Jewish and non-Jewish inhabitants. On February 9, 1941 there were riots on the Rembrandtplein between the WA and Jewish youngsters. On February 11 a group of 40 to 50 WA members marched through Amsterdam to the Waterlooplein in the heart of the Jewish neighbourhood. This led to a pitched battle with Jewish and inhabitants of the Jordaan in which WA member Koot was severely injured. He died a few days later; he was buried with great pomp, and stylized a martyr, in much the same way as Horst Wessel in Nazi Germany. The events led to the first razzias, deportations of Jews and formation of a ghetto in Amsterdam, and from there to the February strike.

Ranks and insignia

References

Paramilitary organisations based in the Netherlands
Dutch collaborators with Nazi Germany
1932 establishments in the Netherlands
Military wings of fascist parties